Barbara Ackermann (1925-2020) was an American politician and activist who served on the Cambridge, Massachusetts School Committee from 1962 to 1967, the City Council from 1968 to 1977, and was Mayor from 1972 to 1973.

She was born Barbara Hulley in 1925 in Stockholm, where her father, Benjamin M. Hulley, a career foreign service officer, was then stationed. She lived her childhood in France and Ireland until briefly returning to the US in 1941.

Ackermann was an opponent of the Vietnam War and a supporter of Eugene McCarthy in the 1968 presidential election.

Ackermann was a candidate for Governor of Massachusetts in 1978. She finished behind Edward J. King and Michael Dukakis in the Democratic primary with 6.72% to King's 51.07% and Dukakis' 42.20%.

Barbara Ackermann died on July 4, 2020 in Lenox, Massachusetts at the age of 95.

References

Massachusetts Democrats
Mayors of Cambridge, Massachusetts
Women mayors of places in Massachusetts
Cambridge, Massachusetts School Committee members
Cambridge, Massachusetts City Council members
20th-century American politicians
20th-century American women politicians
Candidates in the 1978 United States elections
1925 births
2020 deaths
21st-century American women politicians
21st-century American politicians